Andrea Weiss is an American independent documentary filmmaker, author, and professor of film/video at the City College of New York where she co-directs the MFA Program in Film. She was the archival research director for the documentary Before Stonewall: The Making of a Gay and Lesbian Community (1984), for which she won a News & Documentary Emmy Award.

Personal life
Weiss has been awarded fellowships from the National Endowment for the Humanities, National Endowment for the Arts, New York State Council on the Arts, and New York Foundation for the Arts, as well as a U.S./Spain Fulbright Fellowship. She has a Ph.D. in History from Rutgers University.

She has lived in London, Berlin, and Barcelona, and currently resides in New York City.

Career

Books
Weiss is the author of: Vampires and Violets: Lesbians in the Cinema (Jonathan Cape, 1992); Paris Was a Woman: Portraits from the Left Bank (Rivers Oram Press, 1995), which won a Lambda Literary Award, (reprinted by Counterpoint Press in 2013); and In The Shadow of the Magic Mountain: The Erika and Klaus Mann Story (University of Chicago Press, 2008), which won a Publishing Triangle Award. Her books have been translated into French, Spanish, German, Korean, Swedish, Japanese, Slovenian, and Croatian.

Film
She co-founded the non-profit film company Jezebel Productions, with partner Greta Schiller, in 1984.

Film credits include International Sweethearts of Rhythm (1986), Tiny & Ruby: Hell Divin' Women (1988), Paris Was a Woman (1995), A Bit of Scarlet (1997), Seed Of Sarah (1998), Escape to Life: The Erika and Klaus Mann Story (2000) (co-directed with Wieland Speck), I Live At Ground Zero (2002), ReCall Florida (2003), U.N. Fever (2008), and No Dinosaurs in Heaven (2010).

Her 2017 feature documentary, Bones of Contention, premiered at the 2017 Berlin International Film Festival; won Best Documentary at the Side by Side Film Festival; and was featured at QFest in Houston, Outfest in Los Angeles, and the NewFest: New York LGBT Film Festival.

See also
 List of female film and television directors
 List of lesbian filmmakers
 List of LGBT-related films directed by women
 LGBT culture in New York City

References

Further reading
  (book chapter from LGBTQ America Today: An Encyclopedia (2008))

External links
 
 Jezebel Productions

Living people
American documentary filmmakers
American film directors
American film editors
American film producers
American lesbian artists
LGBT film directors
LGBT film producers
American women documentary filmmakers
American women film editors
Filmmakers from New York (state)
City College of New York faculty
News & Documentary Emmy Award winners
1956 births
21st-century American LGBT people
21st-century American women artists